Abe Lebewohl (1931–1996) was the founder of the Second Avenue Deli.  The deli has been described as “possibly the Big Apple’s  most well-known delicatessen” which was “famed worldwide as a hotspot for celebrities and regular Joe's alike.”

Biography
Lebewohl was born in Kulykiv, Ukraine.  His father was sent to Siberia when the Soviets occupied western Ukraine and his mother to Kazakhstan.  When the family was reunited, they made their way to Italy after spending time in Poland and Austria. In 1950, after five years in Italy, they emigrated to the United States, settling in a six story walk up in Williamsburg, Brooklyn.

While making a daytime run to the bank on March 4, 1996, he was murdered.  The gunman has never been caught. He is survived by his daughters Sharon Lebewohl, Felicia Lebewohl-Rosen and his brother Jack.

References

Deaths by firearm in Manhattan
People murdered in New York City
1931 births
1996 deaths
1996 murders in the United States
American restaurateurs
Ukrainian emigrants to the United States
People from Williamsburg, Brooklyn